The Travel Air Model 10 was a 4-seat single-engined light aircraft of the late 1920s. Twelve aircraft were built before production ended.

Design and development
In 1929, the Travel Air Manufacturing Company of Wichita, Kansas, unveiled the Model 10, a four-seat light aircraft of similar layout to the larger Travel Air 6000 airliner, intended for use as an air taxi and charter aircraft. Like the Model 6000, the Model 10 was the work of Herb Rawdon,  and was a single-engined monoplane with a braced, high wing, a fixed tailwheel undercarriage and an enclosed cabin. It was of mixed construction, with a fabric covered steel-tube fuselage and a wooden wing, with spruce spars and spruce and plywood ribs. The prototype was initially powered by a  Wright J-6-9 Whirlwind 9-cylinder radial engine, but was later modified with a  Curtis Challenger radial before finally being fitted with a  7-cylinder Wright J-6-7 Whirlwind.

It was planned to offer the  Model 10 with a range of engines, but owing to the effects of the Great Depression in reducing demand for aircraft, production only followed of the Model 10-D, powered by a Wright J-6-7. This was initially priced at $11,250, but this price soon fell to $8,495. Despite this, only eleven Model 10-Bs were built, and production was ended after Travel Air was purchased by the Curtiss-Wright Corporation. Curtiss-Wright built a four-seat aircraft of similar layout in 1931, designed by the ex-Travel Air engineer Walter Burnham, the Curtiss-Wright CW-15, but this too sold poorly, with only 15 CW-15s built.

Variants
Model 10-B
 Initial prototype, powered by Wright J-6-9 Whirlwind.
Model 10-D
 Production model, powered by Wright J-6-7 Whirlwind. Eleven built.

Specifications (10-D)

References

 
  
 

1930s United States civil utility aircraft
Single-engined tractor aircraft
Aircraft first flown in 1931